Nehru Centre is a centre to promote the teachings and ideals of the first Prime Minister of India, Jawaharlal Nehru, through educational and cultural programmes in the city of Mumbai, India. The Centre organises scientific, cultural and educational activities.

History 

Nehru Centre was conceived in 1972 in Bombay (now Mumbai), India by the late Shri Rajni Patel (an eminent criminal lawyer). 
The foundation stone of this magnificent dream was laid by the late Indira Gandhi on 2 November 1972 on a six-acre plot leased by the Government of Maharashtra.

Departments 

The centre is spread over 20,000 sq.ft. of space. It consists of a Planetarium, an auditorium for 1000 people, experimental theatre, art galleries, library and research centres.

Nehru Planetarium 

This planetarium was commissioned on 3 March 1977. It has grown into a centre for scientific study of astronomy and for meeting of scientists and scholars for discussions and lectures. Events like Science quiz contests, Astro-painting, Science elocution, Astro-poetry and Astro-quiz competitions are organised in order to inspire students.

Discovery of India 

Discovery of India consists of 14 galleries depicting every aspect of artistic, intellectual and philosophical attainment of India through ages. This exposition seeks to determine true identity of the country.
This department also holds activities such as Discovery of India Elocution Competition, Quiz Competition and Essay Competition and science workshop for students every year.

Library 

Nehru Centre Library is located on the first floor of the Discovery of India building. It has about 25,000 books on various disciplines like religion, philosophy, social sciences, astronomy and allied sciences, arts and architecture, literature, history, geography and biographies. There is also a good collection of books on and by Pt. Jawahar Lal Nehru and Mahatma Gandhi.

Art Gallery 
Situated on the ground floor of the Discovery of India building, this gallery consists of two parts. The Nehru Centre Art Gallery is dedicated to promotion of young talent and provides a platform for them to exhibit their work along with that of eminent artists.

Culture Wing 

Regular cultural programmes are organised by Culture wing in all branches of performing arts, like dance, drama, music, etc.

Exhibition Hall
Nehru Centre has two well lit and air-conditioned exhibition halls on the ground floor and three on the second floor of the Discovery of India building. Several national and the international exhibitions are held here.

Publications 
Some of the books published by Nehru Centre are the following:
 Nehru Revisited by M. V. Kamath
 Witness to History: Transition and Transformation of India (1947-64)

See also 
 Nehru Science Centre

References

External links
Official Website

Tourist attractions in Mumbai
Buildings and structures in Mumbai
Monuments and memorials to Jawaharlal Nehru